The Gibraltar Futsal Second Division is the second tier of organized futsal in the British overseas territory of Gibraltar. Since 2018 it has served as the bottom tier in Gibraltar after the Gibraltar Football Association reduced the amount of divisions from 4 to 2. Teams also participate in the Futsal Rock Cup, and through that may participate in the Louisito Bonavia Trophy.

Futsal Second Division 2021–22 season

Source:

List of champions 

 2013-14: Gibraltar Scorpions Revolution
 2014-15: Gibraltar Scorpions Res.
 2015-16: Gunwharf F.C.
 2016-17: Rock 54 F.C.
 2017-18: South United F.C.
 2018-19: Koala F.C.
 2019–20: Abandoned due to COVID-19 pandemic
 2020–21: Stallions F.C.

References

External links
Gibraltar Football Association

Futsal in Gibraltar